Behniwal (sometimes spelled as Beniwal) is a village in Mansa district of Punjab (India). It falls under the market committee of Mansa District Mansa.

Geography 

Raipur, Chehlan Wala, Peron and Bana Wala are the surrounding villages.

Transportation 

The village is located on mansa talwandi road so it is well connected with both cities through buses and some owns vehicles.

Hotels 

There is a one resort and a dhaba where people can stay at night and day.

Health facilities 

The village has one hospital with good doctors, a private dispensary, and one medical store for animals with good doctors and medicines available. There is a gym and a ground .

Education 

There are four schools in the village: Govt. High School, Silver Bells International School, Akal Sahai School, and Mata Gujri Public School.

Economy 

There is a branch of the State Bank of Patiala. Agriculture is the main source of income.

References 

Villages in Mansa district, India
Villages surrounding Talwandi Sabo Power Plant